Neoguraleus trizonata is a species of sea snail, a marine gastropod mollusk in the family Mangeliidae.

This is a taxon inquirendum.

Description
The length of the shell attains 8.7 mm.

Distribution
This marine species occurs off the Philippines and New Caledonia.

References

External links
 Héros, V.; Lozouet, P.; Maestrati, P.; Cosel, R. V.; Brabant, D. & Bouchet, P. (2007). Mollusca of New Caledonia, in: Payri C.E., Richer de Forges B. (Eds.) Compendium of marine species of New Caledonia. Doc. Sci. Tech. II7. Seconde édition, IRD Nouméa, pp 199–254.
 
  Tucker, J.K. 2004 Catalog of recent and fossil turrids (Mollusca: Gastropoda). Zootaxa 682:1-1295.

trizonata
Gastropods described in 1882